Paul H. Fredenburgh III is a retired United States Army brigadier general who is the executive vice president of AFCEA. In the Army, he last served as the Deputy Commander of the Joint Force Headquarters-Department of Defense Information Network from July 2019 to July 2021.

References

External links

Year of birth missing (living people)
Living people
Place of birth missing (living people)
United States Army generals